Godeanu River may refer to:

 Godeanu, a tributary of the river Valea lui Iovan in Gorj County
 the upper reach of the river Orăștie in Hunedoara County

See also 
 Godeanu